The following is a list of ecoregions in Papua New Guinea, as identified by the Worldwide Fund for Nature (WWF).

Terrestrial ecoregions
Papua New Guinea is in the Australasian realm. Ecoregions are listed by biome.

Tropical and subtropical moist broadleaf forests
 Admiralty Islands lowland rain forests
 Central Range montane rain forests
 Huon Peninsula montane rain forests
 Louisiade Archipelago rain forests
 New Britain-New Ireland lowland rain forests
 New Britain-New Ireland montane rain forests
 Northern New Guinea lowland rain and freshwater swamp forests
 Northern New Guinea montane rain forests
 Solomon Islands rain forests
 Southeastern Papuan rain forests
 Southern New Guinea freshwater swamp forests
 Southern New Guinea lowland rain forests
 Trobriand Islands rain forests

Tropical and subtropical grasslands, savannas, and shrublands
 Trans-Fly savanna and grasslands

Montane grasslands and shrublands
 Central Range sub-alpine grasslands

Mangrove ecoregions
 New Guinea mangroves

Freshwater ecoregions
 Bismark Archipelago
 New Guinea Central Mountains
 New Guinea North Coast
 Papuan Peninsula
 Solomon Islands
 Southwest New Guinea – Trans-Fly Lowland

Marine ecoregions

Eastern Coral Triangle
 Bismarck Sea
 Solomon Archipelago
 Solomon Sea
 Southeast Papua New Guinea

Sahul shelf
 Gulf of Papua
 Arafura Sea

References
 Wikramanayake, Eric; Eric Dinerstein; Colby J. Loucks; et al. (2002). Terrestrial Ecoregions of the Indo-Pacific: a Conservation Assessment. Island Press; Washington, DC.
 Freshwater Ecoregions of the World: A global biogeographical regionalization of the Earth's freshwater biodiversity. Accessed 30 March 2020. https://www.feow.org
 Spalding, Mark D., Helen E. Fox, Gerald R. Allen, Nick Davidson et al. "Marine Ecoregions of the World: A Bioregionalization of Coastal and Shelf Areas". Bioscience Vol. 57 No. 7, July/August 2007, pp. 573–583.

Ecoregions of New Guinea
 
Papua New Guinea
ecoregions